Teretoctopus indicus is a species of octopus within the family Octopodidae. Its believed to live in the Western Indian Ocean, although the species is only known from its type locality from the Arabian Sea at a depth of 1000 meters. It has been classified as 'Data deficient' by the IUCN Red List, as there is little to no knowledge of this species.

References 

Molluscs described in 1929
Molluscs of the Indian Ocean
IUCN Red List data deficient species
Octopodidae